The Steilacoom were a Native American tribe who lived in the Puget Sound area of Washington state in the United States. 

They were a Coast Salish people. Other tribes in the Puget Sound region include the Nisqually and Puyallup peoples.

Name 
Other names for the Steilacoom include Steilacoomamish and Stelakubalish.

Territory 
Their territory was along the Chambers Creek, also known as Steilacoom Creek, and in what is now Steilacoom, Washington. Archaeologist Carrol L. Riley wrote that Anderson, McNeil Island, and Fox Islands near Puget Sound and the lands along   Chambers and Sequalitchew Creeks were Steilacoom Territory.

An archaeological site on the north shore of Chambers Creek in Pierce County, Washington, was confirmed by Western Washington University archaeologist Herbert C. Taylor Jr. as being a Steilacoom summer encampment.

History and subsistence 
The Steilacoom spoke a sub-dialect of the Salish language. They depended largely on the ocean for subsistence but traveled inland to hunt.

The tribe was thought to have numbered about 500 members prior to European contact, though by 1853 a smallpox epidemic had decreased that number to about 25 individuals. In 1854 the remnants of the tribe entered into the Medicine Creek Treaty but did not receive a permanent reservation.

Contemporary heritage group 
The Steilacoom Tribe of Indians, an unrecognized organization based in Steilacoom, Washington, claims descent from the historic Steilacoom people. They also claim to be composed of five bands: Steilacoom, Sastuck, Spanaway, Tlithlow, and Segwallitchu. They are neither a federally recognized tribe nor a state-recognized tribe.

Beginning in 1929, members embarked on an unsuccessful process of official recognition by the United States government. As of the early 21st century, the group claimed about 600 members, however, a 2008 investigation by the Bureau of Indian Affairs (BIA) found that "only three of them are documented descendants of persons described in 19th and early 20th century documents as Steilacoom Indians" with the remainder having Native ancestry from other sources. The heritage group formed the Steilacoom Tribal Museum Association, 501(c)(3) nonprofit organization in 2019.

See also
 Lake Steilacoom
 Steilacoom, Washington, town named after the tribe

Notes

References 
 

Coast Salish
Extinct Native American tribes
Native American history of Washington (state)
Native American tribes in Washington (state)
Unrecognized tribes in the United States